Heydarabad (also Romanized as Ḩeydarābād) is a village in Sain Rural District, in the Central District of Sarab County, East Azerbaijan Province, Iran. At the 2006 census, its population was 47, in 8 families.

References 

Populated places in Sarab County